Martin Daly may refer to:

Martin Daly (professor) (born 1944), professor of psychology at McMaster University
Martin Daly (captain) (born 1957), captain and surfer